Winona Municipal Airport  (Max Conrad Field) is located three miles northwest of Winona, Minnesota and next to Goodview on the Mississippi River, in Winona County, Minnesota. It has no scheduled airline flights.

Facilities
The airport covers 575 acres (233 ha) at an elevation of 656 feet (200 m). It has one asphalt runway: 12/30 is 5,679 by 100 feet (1,731 x 30 m).

For the year ending July 31, 2019 the airport had 10,450 aircraft operations, an average of 29 per day: 92% general aviation, 8% air taxi and less than 1% military.
In December 2021, there were 30 aircraft based at this airport: 26 single-engine, 2 multi-engine, 1 jet and 1 glider.

Cargo operations

Past airline service
 Wisconsin Central/North Central Airlines served Winona from 1951/52 until 1969/70.
 Mississippi Valley Airlines DHC-6 Twin Otters took over in the 1970s.

References

External links
  

Airports in Minnesota
Buildings and structures in Winona County, Minnesota
Transportation in Winona County, Minnesota